East Midlands 1 was a tier 9 English Rugby Union league with teams from Bedfordshire, Northamptonshire and parts of Cambridgeshire taking part.  Promoted teams moved up to Midlands 4 East (North) (formerly Midlands East 2) and relegated teams dropped to East Midlands 2.  Originally a feeder league for East Midlands/Leicestershire, it ran for three spells between 1987–1992, 1996–1998 (as East Midlands) and 2000–2004.
 
At the end of the 2003–04 season the East Midlands leagues were restructured and the majority of teams in East Midlands 1 were transferred into the new East Midlands/South Leicestershire 1 division.

Original teams

When league rugby began in 1987, this division contained the following teams:

Ampthill
Biggleswade
Daventry
Dunstablians
Huntingdon & District
Northampton BBOB
Northampton Old Scouts
Rushden & Higham
St Neots
Wellingborough
Wellingborough Old Grammarians

East Midlands 1 honours

East Midlands 1 (1987–1992)

The original East Midlands 1 was a tier 8 league.  Promotion was to East Midlands/Leicestershire and relegation to East Midlands 2. At the end of the 1991–92 season all of the East Midlands and Leicestershire leagues were merged and most sides in East Midlands 1 transferred to the new East Midlands/Leicestershire 2.

East Midlands (1996-1998)

After an absence of four seasons the division was reintroduced, this time as East Midlands, sitting at tier 10 of the league system.  Promotion was to East Midlands/Leicestershire 1 and there was no relegation.  Remerging of all the East Midlands and Leicestershire leagues meant that East Midlands was cancelled at the end of the 1997–98 season and the majority of teams transferred into East Midlands/Leicestershire 2.

East Midlands 1 (2000–2004)

An East Midlands division returned for the third time, this time renamed back to East Midlands 1 and rising to become a tier 9 league following the cancellation of the East Midlands/Leicestershire leagues at the end of the 1999–00 season.  Promotion was to the newly introduced Midlands 4 East (South) and relegation to East Midlands 2.  East Midlands 1 was cancelled at the end of the 2003–04 season and most teams transferred into the new East Midlands/South Leicestershire 1.

Number of league titles

Biggleswade (3)
Northampton BBOB (2)
Ampthill (1)
Daventry (1)
Deepings (1)
Long Buckby (1)
Northampton Casuals (1)
Wellingborough (1)

Notes

See also
East Midlands 2
East Midlands 3
Midlands RFU
East Midlands RFU
English rugby union system
Rugby union in England

References

External links
 East Midlands Rugby Union official website

Defunct rugby union leagues in England
Rugby union in Bedfordshire
Rugby union in Cambridgeshire
Rugby union in Northamptonshire
Sports leagues established in 1987
Sports leagues disestablished in 2004